Nabal (no HWV number) is an oratorio pastiche. It was compiled from the works of Handel in 1764 by John Christopher Smith. It was first performed on 16 March 1764 at Covent Garden, London.

The recitatives are presumably the work of Smith, while the arias are largely borrowed from Handel's operas, oratorios, anthems and cantatas.

Dramatis Personae
Nabal (bass)
Abigail (soprano)
David (tenor)
Asaph (soprano)
Shepherd (soprano)

Summary

External links
 gfhandel.org Nabal review.

Oratorios by George Frideric Handel
1764 compositions